Cape Gray is a headland in North Greenland. Administratively it is part of the Northeast Greenland National Park.

Geography
Cape Gray is located at the southern end of Castle Island, near the mouth of the Sherard Osborn Fjord opposite the eastern shore of Hendrik Island.

Pointing towards the inner fjord, it is one of the two capes of the island, together with the northernmost headland, Cape Cleveland.

See also
Peary Land

References

Headlands of Greenland